Party Mix is a collection of multiplayer games developed for the Supercharger add-on to the Atari 2600 console and published by Starpath in 1983.

Gameplay
The anthology consists of five titles: Bop a Buggy, Tug of War, Wizard's Keep, Down on the Line, and Handcar.

References

External links
Party Mix at Atari Mania
Party Mix at AtariAge

1983 video games
Atari 2600 games
Atari 2600-only games
Multiplayer video games
Party video games
Starpath games
Video games developed in the United States